In Loving Memories: The Jerry Lee Lewis Gospel Album is an album by Jerry Lee Lewis that was released on Mercury Records in 1971.

Background
Lewis's love for gospel music is well documented. As a teenager, Lewis studied at the Southwest Bible Institute in Waxahachie, Texas.

Recording
Lewis produced the album himself with his sister Linda Gail Lewis, who wrote on the back jacket that "Jerry Lee has always played his own style of Gospel music."  In addition to the usual musicians that accompanied him on his recent Mercury albums, Lewis is backed by the Jordanaires and the Nashville Sounds. The album features well known Gospel songs that country music listeners would have been quite familiar with, such as "I'll Fly Away" and "The Lily of the Valley" as well as three songs composed by Linda Gail and Lewis's manager Cecil Harrelson.

Reception
In Loving Memories was released in 1971 and, promoted by Mercury executives.

Track listing
"In Loving Memories" (Linda Gail Lewis, Cecil J. Harrelson) - 3:14
"The Lily of the Valley" (Charles Fry, William Shakespeare Hays) - 2:50
"Gather 'Round Children" (Linda Gail Lewis, Cecil J. Harrelson) - 3:03
"My God's Not Dead" (Thomas La Verne, Donnie Pittman, Bill Taylor) - 1:42
"He Looked Beyond My Fault" (Dottie Rambo) - 2:55
"The Old Rugged Cross" (George Bennard; arranged by Jerry Lee Lewis) - 2:40
"I'll Fly Away" (Albert E. Brumley, Eddie DeBruhl) - 2:45
"I'm Longing for Home" (Rev. Rupert Cravens, Orville Davis) - 3:10
"Too Much to Gain to Lose" (Dottie Rambo) - 2:35
"If We Never Meet Again"/"I'll Meet You in the Morning" (Albert E. Brumley) - 2:50

Personnel
Jerry Lee Lewis - piano, vocals
Linda Gail Lewis - duet vocals on "I Know That Jesus Will Be There"
Buck Hutcheson, Harold Bradley, Ray Edenton - guitar
Ned Davis - steel guitar
Kenny Lovelace - fiddle
Bob Moore, Eddie DeBruhl - bass
Buddy Harman - drums
The Nashville Sounds, The Jordanaires - choral backing vocals
Technical 
Desmond Strobel - art direction
Kerig Pope - album design

1971 albums
Jerry Lee Lewis albums
Gospel albums by American artists
Mercury Records albums